Petersburg is a city in and the county seat of Menard County, Illinois, United States, on the bluffs and part of the floodplain overlooking the Sangamon River. It is part of the Springfield, Illinois Metropolitan Statistical Area. The population was 2,258 at the 2020 census, nearly unchanged from 2010.

History
The town began as a planned community organized by real estate speculators Peter Lukins (for whom the town is named) and George Warburton. Abraham Lincoln worked as the surveyor who first mapped, measured and help to divide lots on the land. Petersburg quickly grew, due to an advantageous placement on the river, becoming the county seat in the 1830s and eventually drawing off the population of New Salem, which was abandoned in 1840.

Many of the lush Victorian-era homes built by early wealthy inhabitants still stand on the bluffs of Petersburg. The town itself takes great pride in these structures, which has even preserved some of the original cobblestone streets to complement the classical architecture.

Local legend has it that the town's name came about when Peter Lukins and George Warburton, two notorious sots, argued over what to call it. The matter was allegedly settled over a game of cards, which Lukins is credited as winning. Most versions of the tale claim that Warburton had it in mind to name the village "Georgetown." This story, though often told in the area, has not been historically verified.

Economy

Petersburg began as a trade center for agriculture in the region and a shipping point, where a railhead met a point in the Sangamon River that was both navigable and crossable. In recent decades, the depth of the Sangamon River at Petersburg has become too shallow for navigation, due to silting from local farming and from the diverting of natural runoff into artificial reservoirs such as Lake Petersburg and Lake Springfield.

The economy of the area is still derived primarily from agriculture, particularly in corn production. Tourism is a steady (if small) industry, and the town caters to Lincoln enthusiasts as a gateway to New Salem and in housing some relics of Lincoln's early life in Illinois. There are also a growing number of bed and breakfast inns, many of which are located in restored Victorian homes. Recent developments have also turned the town into a bedroom community for the state capital of Springfield, Illinois, which is some twenty miles to the southeast.

Notable people 

 William Taylor Davidson, newspaper editor; born in Petersburg
 Bill Krieg, utility player for the Chicago Browns/Pittsburgh Stogies, Chicago White Stockings, Brooklyn Grays and Washington Nationals; born in Petersburg
 Harris Laning, admiral, United States Navy; born in Petersburg
 Edgar Lee Masters, lawyer and author (Spoon River Anthology); buried in Petersburg's Oakland Cemetery; boyhood home is still preserved and open for visits
 William B. McKinley, United States senator from Illinois
 Ann Rutledge, allegedly Abraham Lincoln's first love; buried in Petersburg's Oakland Cemetery

Geography
Petersburg is located in central Menard County and Illinois Route 97 passes through the city on Sixth Street, leading northwest  to Havana and southeast  to Springfield, the state capital. Illinois Route 123 enters Petersburg from the south with IL 97 but leaves to the east on East Sangamon Street. IL 123 leads east and south  to Athens, and southwest  to Illinois Route 125 near Pleasant Plains.

The bulk of Petersburg lies on the bluffs overlooking the Sangamon River, though a portion of it, including the downtown/courthouse square area, is technically on the floodplain of the river. The Sangamon flows north, then west to the Illinois River at Beardstown.

The town itself is moderately forested, a stark contrast to the flat plains around it. The trees are mostly deciduous maples and oaks, and New Salem State Park is home to a sizable stand of old-growth forest.

Natural disasters

Petersburg was damaged by an earthquake originating in the New Madrid Fault on July 18, 1909. The earthquake was felt over most of central Illinois, but Petersburg suffered the most widespread damage.

The portions of Petersburg located below the bluffs suffered major flood damage during the intense flood season of 1993. The city and Menard County have since undertaken a campaign to buy and eliminate the low-income housing located in the most flood-prone areas, creating a small series of parks near the Sangamon River.

Shortly after 12:30pm on December 31, 2010, an estimated 40 homes were damaged by a tornado, with 22 of the homes listed as uninhabitable by local officials. The tornado was caused by springlike weather during which the temperature was in the 60s across central Illinois.

Demographics

As of the census of 2000, there were 2,299 people, 997 households, and 612 families residing in the city. The racial makeup of the city was 97.78% White, 1.09% African American, 0.39% Native American, 0.22% Asian, 0.35% from other races, and 0.17% from two or more races. Hispanic or Latino of any race were 0.78% of the population.

There were 997 households, out of which 31.6% had children under the age of 18 living with them, 44.8% were married couples living together, 13.7% had a female householder with no husband present, and 38.6% were non-families. 35.7% of all households were made up of individuals, and 18.0% had someone living alone who was 65 years of age or older. The average household size was 2.23 and the average family size was 2.89.

In the city the population was spread out, with 24.5% under the age of 18, 8.2% from 18 to 24, 27.4% from 25 to 44, 20.7% from 45 to 64, and 19.2% who were 65 years of age or older. The median age was 38 years. For every 100 females, there were 83.3 males. For every 100 females age 18 and over, there were 79.0 males.

The median income for a household in the city was $34,688, and the median income for a family was $42,500. Males had a median income of $32,292 versus $22,396 for females. The per capita income for the city was $18,718. About 13.8% of families and 16.0% of the population were below the poverty line, including 26.6% of those under age 18 and 6.9% of those age 65 or over.

Media
Petersburg is served by WCIA, WICS, WAND, WSEC, WRSP television stations. Petersburg is also served by The State Journal-Register newspaper in Springfield and The Petersburg Observer.

Points of interest 
 The Edgar Lee Masters Home is located on the corner of Eighth and Jackson streets in Petersburg. Open from 10:00 a.m. to noon and 1:00 to 3:00 p.m. Tuesday through Saturday, Memorial Day through Labor Day.
This is where Abraham Lincoln lived from 1831 to 1837. Along with the rebuilt cabins, the park also boasts a historical center and an outdoor theater. It now has more than one-half million visitors each year.

References

External links

Lincoln's New Salem State Historic Site

 
Cities in Illinois
1833 establishments in Illinois
Populated places established in 1833
Cities in Menard County, Illinois
County seats in Illinois
Populated places established in the 1830s